Saint Michael's College (St. Mikes or Saint Michael's) is a private Roman Catholic college in Colchester, Vermont. Saint Michael's was founded in 1904 by the Society of Saint Edmund. It grants Bachelor of Arts and Bachelor of Science degrees in over 30 majors to over 1,600 undergraduate students. Housing availability is guaranteed for all four years although about 10% of students, mostly upperclassmen, live off campus.

History

In 1889, priests from the Society of Saint Edmund fled to the United States after widespread anticlericalism seized France. In 1904, they opened Saint Michael's Institute with an initial investment of $5,000. Thirty-four students aged 10 to 22 enrolled, with a tuition and board fee of $105. Slowly, the school discontinued its high school program. Gradually, the school transitioned from an academy to a traditional residential college. In 1939, graduate programs were offered for the first time.

Saint Michael's Playhouse was opened in 1947, bringing professional summer theater to Vermont, and giving students the chance to work behind the scenes.

Before the 1950s, classes at Saint Michael's were small, with just a few dozen Michaelmen in any class. In the 1950s, the college expanded to hundreds of students per class. To manage the influx of GI Bill students after World War II, Saint Michael's acquired temporary housing in the form of military barracks from Fort Ethan Allen in Colchester. In the 1950s, the college began a building program that established the red brick architectural style that permeates campus today.

In the 1950s, freshmen were required to wear a dress shirt, coat, and tie to every class and for the evening meal. All dorm students said the rosary before retiring.

Saint Michael's Applied Linguistics Department was started in 1954, focusing on teaching English to students from around the world.

About 130 refugees from the Hungarian Revolution of 1956 came to the college. Most of them, already well-educated, came to learn English.

In April 1970, the Board of Trustees approved a proposal by then-president Bernard Boutin to become a co-educational institution. In 1972, the first four female graduates of Saint Michael's received their degrees.

Presidents 
 Amand Prével (1904–1907)
 Brandon M. Cohane (1907–1913)
 Edmund M. Total (1913–1919)
 William Jeanmarie (1919–1931)
 Eugene Alliot (1931–1934)
 Leon E. Gosselin (1934–1940)
 James H. Petty (1940–1946)
 Daniel P. Lyons (1946–1952)
 Francis E. Moriarty (1952–1958)
 Gerald E. Dupont (1958–1969)
 Bernard L. Boutin (1969–1974)
 Francis E. Moriarty (1974–1976)
 Edward L. Henry (1976–1985)
 Paul J. Reiss (1985–1996)
 Marc A. vanderHeyden (1996–2007)
 John J. Neuhauser (2007–2018)
 Lorraine Sterritt (2018–Present)

Campus

The college consists of two campuses, the Main (also called South) and the North.

The main campus is the original and largest, with most of the classrooms, administration buildings, and residence halls. The Quad is anchored by Durick Library to the west and the Chapel of Saint Michael the Archangel to the east. The three academic halls, Cheray Hall, Jeanmarie Hall, and Saint Edmund's Hall, along with the McCarthy Arts Center line the Quad to the south. The Alliot Student Center and the four underclass residence halls wall the Quad on the north.

Also located on the main campus are the Doc Jacobs Athletic Fields, Ross Sports Center and Tarrant Recreation Center, Founder's Hall, which houses the administrative offices, and the Hoehl Welcome Center, which houses the Admissions office. Standing at the main gateway of the school, admission interviews with prospective students are held in Hoehl.

North Campus, one mile (1.6 km) from Main Campus, features additional residence halls, some apartments, and the Sloane Art Center, which has studio arts facilities for drawing and painting, the photography darkroom, and some classrooms.  Sloane also contains the Knights of the Round Table, a dining hall.

Beginning in 2015, the school began closing many of North Campus's residential areas and sold much of the undeveloped property to the University of Vermont's Medical School. This decision reflected the high cost of maintaining the aging housing and the high deficits the school was facing. As of Fall 2018 North Campus is partially occupied by small summer programs, but during the fall and spring semesters is used exclusively for parking and art classes.

Demographics
As of spring 2018, there were approximately 1,600 undergraduate students, about 20% of the students are in-state; of the 80% out-of-state, 2% are international.  Undergraduate students at the college come from 35 states and 17 countries. Saint Michael's has 155 full-time faculty members; creating a 12:1 student-to-faculty ratio on campus. There are 439 graduate students who attend the college; over 90 percent are from Vermont.

Sustainability

Saint Michael's has taken many steps towards sustainability over the years.  It was named the first fair trade school in Vermont.  Along with the initiatives in the cafeteria, Saint Michael's has an organic garden that started in 2008 and has grown into a huge project for students and faculty alike.  The garden utilizes student volunteers through the Mobilization of Volunteer Efforts (MOVE) program and also works with summer interns and crew members to prepare the vegetables for Farm Stands that run from mid-summer through the beginning of fall.  The school also provides a free CCTA commuter pass to all students, staff, and faculty.  To improve water conservation, dual-flush handles for toilets have begun to be installed in various buildings around campus. All campus showerheads and sink aerators are low-flow.  Saint Michael's College also took the St. Francis Pledge, a promise, and commitment by Catholic individuals, families, parishes, organizations, and institutions to live their faith by protecting the environment and advocating on behalf of people in poverty who face the harshest impacts of global climate change.  As part of the college's ban on bottled water, the Office of Sustainability has installed several water bottle fill stations throughout campus, allowing students to more easily use their reusable water bottles.  Saint Michael's College has been recycling throughout the campus since 1989 and also takes steps toward improving energy such as the Light Bulb Exchange Program (switching out standard light bulbs for energy-efficient light bulbs) and 3 Degree Challenge (lowering temperatures in residence halls and academic buildings) while working to increase the energy and electrical efficiency of campus buildings.  Two most recently constructed campus buildings, The Dion Family Center and Residence Hall Four use geothermal wells to meet the greater majority of their heating needs. Combined with many educational programs on energy consumption run by the Office of Sustainability, the college has reduced its carbon footprint by 29% since 2003.  In 2018 the college's Board of Trustees established the Saint Michael's College Natural Area on 365 acres of campus. The Natural Area includes a substantial conservation easement protecting floodplains and wetlands in perpetuity. In 2020 three restored wetlands were installed in former cornfield. The Natural Area is used for research, education, recreation, and athletics. The area is open to the public and heavily utilized by birders. Saint Michael's also offers both Environmental Studies and Environmental Science majors and an Environmental Studies minor for those students interested in further focusing on the environment from the perspective of natural sciences, social sciences, and the humanities.

Housing
Students at Saint Michael's College live in a variety of different housing facilities.  All housing is single-sex by floor or wing.

Main campus
Joyce Hall, Ryan Hall, and Lyons Hall are three of the four main quad dormitories.  They consist primarily of doubles and house the entire freshman class. Some wings are reserved for Honors Housing and GREAT Housing, the alcohol-free living option.
Alumni Hall is the fourth dormitory building on the main quad, and houses sophomores and juniors.
Cashman Hall, Pontigny Hall, and Canterbury Hall consist of four and eight-person suites for sophomores, juniors, and some seniors.  Many suites are reserved for Honors Housing, GREAT Housing, and Ambassador Housing.
Hodson and the newest building on campus, Residence Hall 4, are apartment-style housing for juniors and seniors.
The Townhouses, numbered in series; 100s, 200s, 300s, and 400s, house seniors in apartment-style living. In the summer of 2008, kitchens were added to the 400s in order to accommodate the senior housing initiative.

Major additions

The Dion Family Student Center is a $30 million structure creating a new 40,000 square-foot student center and 43,000 square-foot residence hall on campus, completed in the fall of 2013. The student center brings new meeting spaces as well as high-tech capabilities, Einstein Bros. Bagels, an exercise facility and a meditation room.

Academics

 
Classes are small and hands-on learning is emphasized, with a student-to-teacher ratio of 12:1  Saint Michael's houses the following honors: Phi Beta Kappa; Delta Epsilon Sigma, the Catholic honor society; Pi Sigma Alpha for Political Science; Omicron Delta Epsilon for Economics; Phi Alpha Theta for History; Kappa Delta Pi for Education; Psi Chi for Psychology; Sigma Xi for Science and Technology; Pi Mu Epsilon for Mathematics; Beta Beta Beta for Biology; Kappa Tau Alpha for Journalism and Mass Communication (the only KTA chapter nationwide housed at a small college); and Sigma Beta Delta for Business, Management, and Administration. Four Saint Michael's professors have been named the CASE/Carnegie Foundation Vermont Professor of the Year. Saint Michael's College is accredited by the New England Commission of Higher Education.

Undergraduate
Undergraduate programs include over 30 majors and minors, combined with a liberal studies curriculum and experiential learning requirement. Emphasis is placed on independent study, independent research, internships, and foreign study.  Eligible students can also participate in the college's Honors Program. The most popular undergraduate majors at Saint Michael's College, based on 2021 graduates, were:
Business Administration & Management (42)
Biology/Biological Sciences (41)
Psychology (34)
Environmental Studies (22)
Mass Communication/Media Studies (18)

Graduate
There are three master's degree programs: Clinical Psychology, Education, and Teaching English as a Second/Foreign Language. There are three post-master's certificates and Vermont teacher licensure programs. The master's degree programs in Administration and Management and in Theology and Pastoral Ministry have been phased out.

International students
Special English as a Second Language program is offered for international students through the Applied Linguistics Department, including a program that assists international students in the transition to college-level coursework.

Study abroad
Students may participate in study abroad programs, which cost the same as a semester on campus. Students can choose from over 100 different programs located around the globe and can choose a program by location or language, or from a variety of special Saint Michael's programs. Over a third of students choose to study abroad.

Culture
Nearly 100% of students live on campus in residence halls and townhouses.  There are over 40 student organizations.  There are no fraternities or sororities. Other activities include Saint Michael's Fire and Rescue student volunteer first responders, Student Association, Adventure Sports Program, Campus Ministry, the campus radio station WVTX, club sports, student musical and play productions, the Saint Michael's Chorale, Vermont Gregorian Chant Schola, open mic nights and various instrumental and vocal ensembles. Christmas and spring semi-formal dances are held. Athletics facilities include a fitness room, racquetball and an indoor track and swimming pool. Trails surround the campus for cross-country running or mountain biking.

Athletics

There are 21 varsity sports (10 for men, 11 for women) and over 20 intramural teams. Saint Michael's varsity sports teams are called the Purple Knights. The school colors are purple and gold. Eighteen varsity teams participate in the NCAA's Division II Northeast-10 Conference; Alpine and Nordic skiing are members of the multi-divisional Eastern Intercollegiate Ski Association (EISA), and women’s ice hockey competes in Division I New England Women's Hockey Alliance. Approximately 25% of students participate in a varsity sport. For men: Baseball, basketball, cross country, golf, ice hockey, lacrosse, skiing (Alpine and Nordic), soccer, swimming & diving, and tennis. For women: basketball, cross country, field hockey, ice hockey, lacrosse, skiing, soccer, softball, swimming & diving, tennis, and volleyball.  Student-led programs include men's and women's rugby, billiards, ping pong, floor hockey, volleyball, and indoor soccer.  Tournaments are also scheduled throughout the academic year.  Yoga, jazzercise, kickboxing, cardio step, and pilates courses are offered weekly.  First Aid and CPR training/certification is also offered. There are also two club sports on campus, Ultimate Frisbee and Rugby. Ultimate Frisbee operates a mixed squad (men and women playing at the same time) competing in tournaments all over New England.  Having only four losses and an astounding 40 wins since the 2018-2019 academic year the Ultimate team is the pride of the athletics on campus with their minimal resources and stupendous record.

Fire and Rescue
 One of the extracurricular activities at Saint Michael's is the Fire and Rescue program. Entirely student-run, the department provides fire protection and emergency medical treatment to campus and the surrounding community.  The EMT program is one of seven college-run EMT programs with a full-service area in the country. The fire program is one of the only entirely volunteer student-run departments in the nation.

Saint Michael's Playhouse
Saint Michael's Playhouse is the college's professional equity summer theater.  The Playhouse is a member of the Council of Resident Stock Theaters (CORST).  As a CORST theater company, Saint Michael's Playhouse employs members of Actors' Equity Association, as well as directors from the Stage Directors and Choreographers Society and designers from United Scenic Artists.

The playhouse also maintains a Professional Theater Internship Program for college theater students.  Acceptance into this program is competitive.

The college provides student access to a Saint Michael's-sponsored Culture Pass to the Flynn Center for the Performing Arts.

The college was also a sponsor of the Vermont Mozart Festival, formerly the state's largest classical music festival.

Clubs and organizations
Saint Michael's offers over 40 different student-run clubs and organizations. Clubs range from the arts (e.g. A cappella groups, Drama Club, Chorale) to community groups (e.g. Common Ground, Food Justice, Student Global AIDS Campaign) to academic clubs (e.g. The Defender, French Club, Onion River Review).

The campus also offers various club sports such as cycling, dance, rugby (men's and women's), ski & snowboarding, ultimate frisbee, and water polo.

Turtle Underground is a student-run program that promotes student art, music, and performance. There are shows on most Saturdays during the semester. These have featured a variety of acts, ranging from DJs to solo singer-songwriters to jam bands.

Student publications include The Defender, a weekly newspaper, and the Onion River Review, a literary magazine.

Volunteer efforts
MOVE (Mobilization of Volunteer Efforts) is the service organization on campus. Over 65 students lead MOVE programs locally, domestically, and internationally under the guidance of the program's director and assistant director. MOVE has the highest participation rate of any organization on campus with over 70% of students volunteering with the program by the time they graduate.

Adventure Sports Center
The Adventure Sports Center (ASC) at Saint Michael's College features hiking, rock climbing, ice climbing, snowshoeing, kayaking, and skiing. The ASC also offers a season pass to Smugglers Notch.

Notable alumni

Moses Anderson 1954, Roman Catholic bishop
Tim Arango 1996, Baghdad bureau chief of The New York Times
Tom Bowman 1977, National Public Radio's Pentagon reporter
Frederick M. "Skip" Burkle Jr 1961, humanitarian assistance and disaster response specialist
Tom Caron, host of Boston Red Sox coverage on NESN
Donald Cook, United States Marine Corps officer, prisoner of war, and Medal of Honor recipient
Thomas W. Costello 1968, Vermont House of Representatives
 Ann Cummings MSA 1989, mayor of Montpelier, Vermont, and member of the Vermont Senate
 Rudolph J. Daley (attended), Associate Justice of the Vermont Supreme Court
Thomas E. Delahanty II 1967, Maine Superior Court justice
Joseph F. Dunford Jr. 1977, 19th Chairman of the Joint Chiefs of Staff and 36th Commandant of the Marine Corps
James Fallon 1969, neuroscientist
Roger Festa 1972, chemistry professor at Truman State University, former president of the American Institute of Chemists
Michael J. Fitzpatrick, New York State Assemblyman representing the 7th district in Suffolk County
Tom Freston 1967, former president and CEO of Viacom and one of the founders of MTV
Robert Hoehl 1963, co-founder of IDX Systems Corporation
Martin Hyun 2003, author, professional ice hockey player with Deutsche Eishockey Liga, 2018 PyeongChang Winter Olympics Deputy Sport Manager 
Vincent Illuzzi 1975, youngest person ever elected to Vermont State Senate, state senator 1981-2013
Brian Kelley, CIA officer
George Latimer, DFL mayor of Saint Paul, Minnesota
Patrick Leahy 1961, senior U.S. senator from Vermont
Bernard Joseph Leddy, former United States federal judge
Earle B. McLaughlin (attended), U.S. Marshal for Vermont
Robert W. Parker, United States Air Force major general
Christina Reiss 1984, federal judge for the United States District Court for the District of Vermont
Harold C. Sylvester (attended), judge of the Vermont Superior Court, Associate Justice of the Vermont Supreme Court
Richard Tarrant 1965, co-founder of IDX Systems Corporation
Michael Tranghese, former commissioner of the Big East Conference
Loung Ung 1993, human-rights activist, lecturer, author of First They Killed My Father.
 Travis Warech (attended; born 1991), American-German-Israeli basketball player for Israeli team Hapoel Be'er Sheva 
Michael William Warfel G 1990, prelate of the Roman Catholic Church, seventh and current Bishop of Great Falls-Billings.
Robert White, president of the Center for International Policy, former US Ambassador to El Salvador and Paraguay

Notable faculty
Aostre Johnson, professor of education
John Engels, professor of English 
Greg Delanty, professor of English

See also
 List of colleges and universities in the United States
 List of colleges and universities in Vermont

References

External links
 
 Official athletics website

 
Buildings and structures in Colchester, Vermont
Educational institutions established in 1904
Fair trade schools
Education in Chittenden County, Vermont
Buildings and structures in Chittenden County, Vermont
Tourist attractions in Chittenden County, Vermont
Catholic universities and colleges in Vermont
Association of Catholic Colleges and Universities
Roman Catholic Diocese of Burlington
1904 establishments in Vermont